Georges Chamarat (30 March 1901 – 21 November 1982) was a French actor. He appeared in more than 100 films and television shows between 1929 and 1981. He starred in the film The Adventures of Arsène Lupin, which was entered into the 7th Berlin International Film Festival.

Partial filmography

 President Haudecoeur (1940)
 Annette and the Blonde Woman (1942)
 La Main du diable (1943)
 Pierre and Jean (1943)
 Adrien (1943)
 Late Love (1943)
 Majestic Hotel Cellars (1945)
 Her Final Role (1946)
 The Seventh Door (1947)
 Bluebeard (1951)
 Two Pennies Worth of Violets (1951)
 Adorables créatures (1952)
 An Artist with Ladies (1952)
 Julietta (1953)
 The Lovers of Marianne (1953)
 The Sheep Has Five Legs (1954)
 Wild Fruit (1954)
 Quay of Blondes (1954)
 Mam'zelle Nitouche (1954)
 Spring, Autumn and Love (1955)
 Madelon (1955)
 It Happened in Aden (1956)
 Paris, Palace Hotel (1956)
 The Wages of Sin (1956)
 Mannequins of Paris (1956)
 The Adventures of Arsène Lupin (1957)
 Le Miroir à deux faces (1958)
 First of May (1958)
 Thérèse Étienne (1958)
 The Mysteries of Paris (1962)
 All Mad About Him (1967)

References

External links

1901 births
1982 deaths
French male film actors
French male television actors
Male actors from Paris
Sociétaires of the Comédie-Française
20th-century French male actors